Martiněves is a municipality and village in Litoměřice District in the Ústí nad Labem Region of the Czech Republic. It has about 800 inhabitants.

Administrative parts
Villages of Charvatce, Pohořice and Radešín are administrative parts of Martiněves.

Notable people
Otakar Hostinský (1847–1910), historian and musicologist

Gallery

References

Villages in Litoměřice District